Manteca Unified School District (MUSD) is a school district based in French Camp, Lathrop, Manteca, and Stockton, in California.

About
Schools in MUSD follow a modified traditional calendar with approximately 23,000 students.  Elementary schools are from Kindergarten to eighth grade. The balance of required education is finished in high school. The district was formed in 1966.

Schools
August Knodt Elementary School
Brock Elliott Elementary School
French Camp Elementary School
George Komure Elementary School
George McParland Elementary School
Golden West Elementary School
Great Valley Elementary School
Joseph Widmer Elementary school
Joshua Cowell Elementary School
Lathrop Elementary School
Lincoln Elementary School
Mossdale Elementary School
Neil Hafley Elementary School
New Haven Elementary School
Nile Garden Elementary School
Sequoia Elementary School
Shasta Elementary School
Stella Brockman Elementary School
Veritas Elementary School
Walter E. Woodward Elementary School

High schools
East Union High School
Lathrop High School
Manteca High School
Sierra High School
Weston Ranch High School

Other
BE.Tech Career Academies
Calla High School
Lindbergh Educational Center
Manteca Day School
METC (Adult School)
New Vision Educational Center
Online Academy

Transportation

Manteca USD consists of the following buses:
Gen 3 1997-2002 Thomas Saf-T-Liner ER 
Gen 2 Thomas Saf-T-Liner HDX
2010 IC Bus RE Series (MaxxForce DT)
IC Bus CE Series (MaxxForce DT)
1989 Crown Supercoach (Detroit 6N71) (to be phased out as soon as possible)
Blue Bird All American RE (to be introduced in the future, replacing old Crown Supercoach buses)

External links
District's Official Website

School districts in San Joaquin County, California
1966 establishments in California
Manteca, California